Treatments for overactive bladder are therapies used to treat overactive bladder or related conditions, such as urinary incontinence and frequent urination. Behavioral modification and medications are commonly used to treat this condition.

Efficacy of treatments
Studies have shown that few people get complete relief from overactive bladder drugs and that all available drugs are no more than moderately effective. A typical person with overactive bladder may urinate 12 times per day. Medication may reduce this number by 2-3 and reduce urinary incontinence events by 1-2 per day.

A 2009 literature review on women found that no drug seemed better than others, and paid special attention to comparing newer drugs to older ones. There is not sufficient evidence to guide the choices doctors and patients make in treating overactive bladder with experimental treatments including sacral nerve stimulation, oxybutynin instillation, and botulinum toxin injections. The research literature shows that in alternative medicine, acupuncture has shown some efficacy while reflexology and hypnosis have not. Oxybutynin is sometimes used in combination with Kegel exercises and Functional electrical stimulation. 

A 2019 systematic review of studies related to urinary incontinence in women found that behavioral therapy, alone or combined with other treatments, is generally more effective than any other single treatment alone. Some behavior modification practices were associated with benefits comparable to any other treatment.

Non-drug treatments
Non-drug treatments for overactive bladder include sacral nerve stimulation, acupuncture, and behavior modification. Findings from a 2018 systematic review update suggest that behavioral therapy results in better outcomes than using drugs or medications. Behavioral therapy as a treatment has been used to improve or cure urge incontinence while also improving patient satisfaction.

Drugs

Classification of drugs
Most drugs used to treat overactive bladder are muscarinic antagonists.

Comparison of drugs

References

Urinary incontinence
Urology